Paracobitis ghazniensis is a species of stone loach found in Helmand basin in Ghazni River, Helmand River basin, Afghanistan.

References

ghazniensis
Fish of Asia
Fish of Afghanistan
Taxa named by Petre Mihai Bănărescu
Taxa named by Teodor T. Nalbant
Fish described in 1966